Helen Ekin Starrett (Ekin; September 19, 1840 – December 16, 1920) was an American educator, author, suffragist, and magazine founder. Long engaged in educational work in Chicago, she founded the Kenwood Institute (1884), and Mrs. Starrett's Classical School for Girls (1893), of which she was principal. Starrett also founded Western Magazine (1880–83, Chicago). She served as president of the Illinois Woman's Press Association (1893–1894), and was the author of several works.

Early life and education
Helen Martha Ekin was born in Pittsburgh, Pennsylvania, September 19, 1840. She was the daughter of Rev. John and Esther Fell (Lee) Ekin. 

She was educated at Pittsburg High School.

Career

Educator
Starrett was the founder of Kenwood Institute, Chicago. 

Starrett's chief public work was done as principal of the Starrett School for Girls. Upon being widowed, she went to Chicago and there opened a school for girls, at first a very small institution, but it enabled her to keep her family of seven children together, which pleased her. The school grew in usefulness, size and importance, until at the end of 30 years' service as its head, Starrett retired from its active principalship at the age of 75, at which time the title of principal emeritus was conferred upon her. Starrett School for Girls was a co-operative with the University of Chicago. Ten resident pupils were received in the family of the principal. Day pupils were limited in number to 100. Its certificate admitted to Vassar College, Wellesley College, Smith College, as well as to the University of Chicago.

Activist, suffragist
In 1915, she was appointed one of the 100 electors who each five years decided on additions to the list of eminent Americans who would be included in the Hall of Fame established in 1900 by New York University. Starrett and Ida Tarbell were the only women who were added to the list of electors at that time. A delegate to the first U.S. woman suffrage convention (1870) and the last (1920), Starrett was the only surviving member of the pioneer suffragists who first focused public opinion by means of a general convention on the campaign for women's votes.

Writer

Starrett was a contributor to magazines, such as The Continent a Presbyterian publication from McCormick Publishing Company, as well as educational and religious journals. She was the author of Future of Educated Women, 1880: Letters to a Daughter, 1882; Letters to Elder Daughters, 1883; Gyppie, an Obituary, 1884; Pete, the Story of a Chicken, 1885; Letters to a Little Girl, 1886;  andCrocus and Wintergreen, poems (with her sister, Frances Ekin Allison).

Published by Jansen, McClurg & Co., Chicago, The Future Of Educated Women, by Helen Ekin Starrett; and Men, Women And Money, by Frances Ekin Allison, were bound together in one book. The former and larger essay was the more mature of the two, and, although not altogether free from haste and opinionatedness, it had the merit of a point of view. The author discussee the matter of self-support and independence, and that however urgent such may be, they are reduced to insignificance by the necessity of women finding a means of expression for the spiritual growth that takes place in them. She also spoke about labor, like virtue, may be its own reward; and from professional and other means of expressing the fullness of human nature, certainly no one should be debarred. The second essay, by Frances Ekin Allison, is thought out on a lower key, and referenced the independence that a woman feels when she has a source of income in her own right.

Personal life
On February 15, 1864, she married Rev. William A. Starrett. 

She died December 16, 1920, in Portland, Oregon.

Selected works
 After college, what? For girls
 Letters to Elder Daughters
 The future of educated women, 1885
 Letters to a daughter : and a little sermon to school-girls, 1886
 The housekeeping of the future, 1890 (with Julia Ward Howe)
 Gyppy. An obituary, 1890
 Letters to a little girl, 1892
 A pioneer poet, 1894 (with Benjamin Hathaway)
 Crocus and wintergreen, 1907 
 Bereavement and consolation : a little book of poems for Memorial Days,  1919
 Cottage Grove Avenue, Chicago : a study of life on one of the typically ugly streets in the typically "ugly city.", 1920
 The Charm of Fine Manners: Being a Series of Letters to a Daughter, 1920
 The Charm of a Well Mannered Home. (Originally published under the title "Letters to Elder Daughters.")., 1923

Notes

References

Attribution

Bibliography

External links
 
 "A Glimpse of Susan B. Anthony", by Helen Ekin Starrett, The Suffragist, September, 1920
 "Reminiscences by Helen Ekin Starrett", History of Woman Suffrage: 1861–1876, edited by Elizabeth Cady Stanton, Susan B. Anthony, Matilda Joslyn Gage, Ida Husted Harper, 1882

1840 births
1920 deaths
19th-century American writers
19th-century American women writers
Writers from Pittsburgh
Founders of schools in the United States
American school principals
American suffragists
American magazine founders
Women school principals and headteachers